Bass Drum of Death is the eponymous second studio album by Bass Drum of Death. It was released in June 2013 under Innovative Leisure.

The first single from the album "Shattered Me" was released on April 16, 2013.

Track list

References

External links
Bass Drum of Death by Bass Drum of Death at iTunes.com

2013 albums
Bass Drum of Death albums